Charge of the Black Lancers is a 1962 adventure film directed by Giacomo Gentilomo and starring Mel Ferrer, Yvonne Furneaux and Leticia Román.

Cast 

 Mel Ferrer as Andrea 
 Yvonne Furneaux as  Jassa
 Leticia Román as  Mascia
 Lorella De Luca as Samal
 Jean Claudio as  Prince Sergio 
 Annibale Ninchi as  Prince Nikiev
 Franco Silva  as  Gamul
 Nando Tamberlani  as King Stefano III
 Renato De Carmine as Polish Prince  
 Arturo Dominici as Chief of Krevires 
 Remo De Angelis as Official 
 Mirko Ellis as Member of the Council
 Umberto Raho as Member of the Council

Release
Charge of the Black Lancers was released in Italy on 31 August 1962.

Reception
A review in the Monthly Film Bulletin stated that the film's story and sub-plots are "almost enough to fill three or four less exuberant action-spectacles" but was a better than average film of its genre noting its "pace, verve and panache essential for entertainment of this kind"

References

Footnotes

Sources

External links

Charge of the Black Lancers at Variety Distribution

1960s historical adventure films
French historical adventure films
Italian historical adventure films
Films directed by Giacomo Gentilomo
Films set in the Middle Ages
Films with screenplays by Ernesto Gastaldi
Films scored by Mario Nascimbene
1960s French films
1960s Italian films